Las Amapas Beach is a beach at the south end of Zona Romántica, Puerto Vallarta, in the Mexican state of Jalisco. The small beach is separated from Playa de los Muertos by a rock formation known as "El Púlpito" (English: "The Pulpit").

References

External links

 

Beaches of Jalisco
Zona Romántica